Robert Lewis Maza  (25 November 1939 – 14 May 2000), known as Bob Maza, was an Aboriginal Australian actor, playwright and activist.

Early life and education
Robert Lewis Maza was born on Palm Island in North Queensland on 25 November 1939, to a Murray Islander (Torres Strait Islander) father and to a Yidinjdji (Australian Aboriginal) mother.

He was one of the first Aboriginal children in northern Queensland to complete secondary schooling, and described feelings of alienation and being caught between two cultures as a teenager. After finishing school in Cairns, he worked as a labourer and then did office work in Darwin, Northern Territory.

Activism
After moving to Melbourne in the late 1960s, he joined the Aboriginal Advancement League (AAL) and started becoming involved in Indigenous rights activism. He was inspired by Malcolm X Speaks, and subsequently made president of the AAL.

In 1970 Maza attended the third Pan-African Conference in the United States, where he witnessed the effectiveness of Indigenous theatre. Also in 1970, he addressed the United Nations General Assembly on the subject of "the third-world status of Indigenous Australians".

In 1972, he took part in the Aboriginal Tent Embassy protest.

Acting career

Television
After moving to Melbourne in the 1960s, Maza became a musician and actor, featuring in various television dramas, becoming particularly known for his role as the articled clerk Gerry Walters in the ABC series Bellbird. He also appeared in many other television series, including Hunter, Homicide, Harry's War, Wildside, A Difficult Woman, A Country Practice, Women of the Sun and Heartland.

Theatre
In 1971 Maza started working in theatre with Jack Charles, and together they formed Nindethana, putting on a humorous piece called Jack Charles Is Up and Fighting, subtitled "It‟s tough for us Boongs in Australia today". In mid-1972 helped to establish the National Black Theatre in Sydney (with Brian Syron and Justine Saunders), and played a role in their first production, Basically Black.

After the National Black Theatre lost its funding, Maza helped to found the Black Theatre Arts and Culture Centre in Redfern, and was its first artistic director when it opened in July 1974. In January 1975, he directed his first play, Robert J. Merritt's The Cake Man, which was the first play by an Indigenous playwright to be published, televised, and tour internationally. He later directed Roger Bennett's Up the Ladder (1989), Jack Davis' No Sugar (1994) and Owen Love's No Shame (1995).

Appearing on stage for Nimrod Theatre, he acted in Eric Bentley's Are You Now, or Have You Ever Been? (1976), Thomas Keneally's Bullie's House (1980) and Michael Frayn's Clouds (1980).

Films
He also acted in films, including When the Stars Came Dreaming (1998), Lilian's Story (1996), The Back of Beyond (1995), The Nostradamus Kid (1993), Reckless Kelly (1993), Ground Zero (1987), The Fringe Dwellers (1986), BabaKiueria (1986), White Man's Legend (1984), and 27A (1974).

Literary career
Maza's most notable play was The Keepers (1989). Mereki (first performed 8 October 1984), Tiddalik the Frog, and The Rainbow Serpent (1992) were based on traditional pre-colonial stories (see Rainbow Serpent and Tiddalik), with the intention of helping to regenerate Aboriginal culture.

The Keepers, based on the true story of a Scottish settler family meeting the last few members of the Buandig (Boandik) people of Rivoli Bay in South Australia during the frontier wars, was performed at the Adelaide Fringe Festival, by the Troupe Theatre, directed by Geoff Crowhurst, and at Belvoir Street Theatre in 1988, starring Lillian Crombie and Danny Adcock, and directed by Maza.

It was the first play produced by the Aboriginal National Theatre Trust, and Maza won the National Black Playwright Award for the production.

Other activities
Maza lectured in Indigenous Studies at Tranby Aboriginal College in the Sydney suburb of Glebe and was Assistant Director of Studies there.

He was the first Indigenous commissioner of the Australian Film Commission from 1995 to 1998, during which time he helped to create its Indigenous Unit.

Recognition
In 1981 Maza was an official delegate to the World Indigenous Festival in Canada

He won the National Black Playwright Award for The Keepers (1989).

In 1993, he was awarded the Order of Australia for services to the arts and to Indigenous people.
 
In 1998 Maza won the Red Ochre Award, which has been awarded by the Australia Council for the Arts since 1993 to an outstanding Aboriginal or Torres Strait Islander artist for lifetime achievement.

Death and legacy
Maza died on 14 May 2000 in Sydney.

Awards in his name

At the Tudawali Awards in 2002, the Indigenous Unit of the Australian Film Commission (AFC) awarded the Bob Maza Memorial Award, to recognise emerging acting talent and support professional development. This was awarded to Ursula Yovich

Bob Maza Fellowship

Winners of the Bob Maza Fellowship include:
 2005: Ursula Lovich & Tom E. Lewis
 2006: Leah Purcell
 2007: Aaron Pedersen
 2008: Luke Carroll, presented at the Message Sticks Indigenous Film Festival at the Sydney Opera House
2011: Wayne Blair
2013: Tony Briggs

Uncle Bob Maza Memorial Award
The Uncle Bob Maza Memorial Award for Outstanding Contribution to Victorian Indigenous Theatre has been awarded at the Victorian Indigenous Performing Arts (VIPA) Awards for some years. Recipients include:

2003: Rachael Maza
2005: Warren Owens
2014: Noel Tovey
? (twice): Pauline Whyman

Personal life
He married Dutch immigrant to Australia, Vera Blankman, and the couple were parents to actor and director Rachael Maza Long and writer Lisa Maza.

References

1939 births
2000 deaths
20th-century Australian dramatists and playwrights
20th-century Australian male actors
Australian male dramatists and playwrights
Australian male film actors
Australian male television actors
Indigenous Australian male actors
Indigenous Australian writers
Members of the Order of Australia